Robby Robinson (born May 24, 1946) is an American former professional bodybuilder. Known early in his career as Robin Robinson, he is also known as The Black Prince and Mr Lifestyle. He won various competitions including Mr America, IFBB Mr. World, Mr Universe, Masters Olympia, and other titles of the International Federation of BodyBuilding & Fitness (IFBB), and appeared in several films (including the landmark docudrama Pumping Iron) over a 27-year career as a professional bodybuilder, retiring from competition in 2001 at the age of 55.

Biography

Early years
Robinson was born in Damascus, Georgia, and raised in Tallahassee, Florida. His mother was illiterate, and his father was a bootlegger who later abandoned his 14 children. Robinson  attended Florida A&M University, where he competed in both football and track & field. While training for those sports he noticed his body's great responsiveness to weight training, which motivated him to enter his first bodybuilding competition. After competing in more than 300 amateur competitions, Robinson turned professional in 1975. By that year he was married with three children.

Professional years 
In his first year as a professional in 1975, he won the IFBB Mr America, Mr World and Mr Universe titles. He went on to win many IFBB contests, including the first annual Night of the Champions in 1979 as well as the first Masters Olympia in 1994. He was the Masters Olympia overall champion the first year that the event was held in 1994 and won the 50+ division at the same contest in 1997 and 2000.

Robinson appeared as himself in the 1977 part-scripted, part-documentary film on bodybuilding Pumping Iron. He also appeared in a 1989 TV documentary, in the 1997 documentary Stand Tall, and (uncredited) in the 1976 film comedy Stay Hungry.

Post-retirement
Robinson suffers from intermittent bouts of sickle cell crisis. These episodes tended to occur during contest preps, and became one of the reasons he decided to stop competing.

After a 27-year career, Robinson retired from professional bodybuilding at the age of 55. He has remained active in various ways, including as a personal trainer, lifestyle and bodybuilding coach, athlete, artist, and actor. As a published author, Robinson published his autobiography, The Black Prince, in 2013. Since his retirement in 2001, Robby has opposed steroid use in bodybuilding, saying that "it's taking away from the beauty of bodybuilding, the artistry of it." In 2016, aged 70, Robinson continued to make guest posing appearances and maintains a developed physique.

Publications
 The Black Prince: My Life in Bodybuilding; Muscle vs Hustle, self-published memoirs, 2013
 Built DVD – Documentary on bodybuilding, training and health, including interviews with Robinson and workout techniques, 2006
 Master Class with Robby Robinson DVD – featuring Robinson's Master Class on bodybuilding in Venice, California (with Natural Mr Britain Ian Duckett and biomechanic expert Dean Murray)
The Black Prince 2: Diary of a Bodybuilder, self-published compilation of bodybuilding techniques, 2019
Robby Robinson Master Class Android App 
Robby Robinson Master Class iOS App

Major competition awards
Robinson's competition awards have included the following:
 2000 - Mr Olympia - Masters Over 50, 1st
 1997 - Mr Olympia - Masters Over 50, 1st
 1994 - Mr Olympia - Masters - IFBB, Winner
 1991 - Musclefest Grand Prix - IFBB, Winner
 1989 - World Pro Championships - IFBB, Winner
 1988 - Niagara Falls Pro Invitational - IFBB, Winner
 1987 - Mr Olympia - IFBB, 5th
 1981 - Mr Universe - Pro - NABBA, Winner
 1979 - Pittsburgh Pro Invitational - IFBB, Winner
 1979 - Night of Champions - IFBB, Winner
 1979 - Grand Prix New York - IFBB, Winner
 1979 - Best in the World - IFBB, Professional, 1st
 1978 - Professional World Cup - IFBB, Winner
 1978 - Night of Champions - IFBB, Winner
 1978 - Mr Olympia Heavyweight, 1st
 1977 - Mr Olympia - IFBB, Tall, 1st
 1976 - Mr Universe - IFBB, MiddleWeight, 1st
 1976 - Mr Universe - IFBB, Overall Winner
 1976 - Mr International - IFBB, Medium, 1st
 1976 - Mr International - IFBB, Overall Winner
 1975 - Mr Universe - IFBB, Medium, 1st
 1975 - Mr World - IFBB, Medium, 1st
 1975 - Mr World - IFBB, Overall Winner
 1975 - Mr America - IFBB, Medium, 1st
 1975 - Mr America - IFBB, Overall Winner

See also
List of male professional bodybuilders
List of female professional bodybuilders

References

External links
 
 
 Robby Robinson interview with evolutionofbodybuilding.net

1946 births
African-American bodybuilders
Living people
Sportspeople from Tallahassee, Florida
Players of American football from Florida
Professional bodybuilders
Florida A&M Rattlers football players
American memoirists
African-American non-fiction writers
American non-fiction writers
Florida A&M Rattlers track and field athletes
21st-century African-American people
20th-century African-American sportspeople